Eir Sport 2 (stylised as eir Sport 2, formerly Setanta Sports 1) was an Irish pay television channel owned by Setanta Sports Channel Ireland.

The channel carried coverage of association football (including top-flight European leagues and UEFA Europa League), boxing, golf, motorsport, and coverage of the SSE Airtricity League.

On 16 December 2013 Setanta Sports launched a high-definition of Setanta Sports 1. Setanta Sports 1 HD was first exclusively available through Virgin Media Ireland, but later launched on Sky on 20 July 2015, along with Premier Sports HD.

On 15 August 2019, Eir Sport and Virgin Media Sport contracted a deal to show Virgin Media Sport on Eir Vision and Eir Sport 1 on Virgin Media Ireland.

As per eir's announcement on 19 May 2021, Eir Sport 2 closed on 20 July 2021. Eir also announced that Eir Sport 1 will also close before the end of 2021.

Broadcast rights

Most of these aired on both Setanta Ireland and Setanta Sports 1 and were shared between the two channels. In some instances (largely football coverage) Setanta only possessed Republic of Ireland rights, during such programming the channel is unavailable in Northern Ireland. Conversely, live coverage of GAA Championship matches was available only in Northern Ireland and not the Republic.

Club football
 UEFA Champions League
 UEFA Europa League
 FA Cup (Republic of Ireland only)
 League of Ireland
 Setanta Sports Cup

International football
Copa América
Friendly matches, typically on a once-off basis

Gaelic Athletic Association
 GAA Football National League
 GAA Hurling National League
 All-Ireland Senior Hurling Championship  (Live coverage in Northern Ireland, Deferred (not same day) in the Republic of Ireland)
 All-Ireland Senior Football Championship (Live coverage in Northern Ireland, Deferred (not same day) in the Republic of Ireland)

Rugby Union
 IRB Rugby World Cup
 Pro14 (Deferred/highlights only from September 2010 onwards)
 Exclusive rights to the highlights of the RBS 6 Nations
 Certain international rugby union Test games on a one-off basis
 IRB Sevens

Rugby League
 Rugby League World Cup
 National Rugby League

Other programming
Setanta's major in-house programme was The Sports Show (formerly The Hub) which aired daily. It also simulcasted the radio show Off The Ball from Newstalk.

Setanta Sports Cup
Setanta was the sponsor of the Setanta Sports Cup, an annual soccer tournament which featured teams from the League of Ireland and Irish Football League.

Availability
As of July 2016 in the Republic of Ireland, the Eir Sport Package was available for free to any Eir broadband customer. This included the BT Sport package. Additionally the Eir Sport Package was available on Eir TV, Virgin Media Ireland, Sky Ireland and Vodafone TV.  Eir Sport offered commercial venues in Ireland programming of sports such as football (soccer), Gaelic football, hurling, golf, cricket, rugby union and rugby league and boxing.

On 12 September 2019, Eir Sport 2 was removed from Sky in Ireland and was replaced by Virgin Media Sport. On 13 August 2020, Virgin Media Sport's feeds on Eir and Sky Ireland that were provided by Eir were replaced by Eir Sport 2 on those platforms, as Eir refused to pay the contracted distribution license fee.

References

External links

Sports television in Ireland
Television channels and stations established in 2004
Television channels and stations disestablished in 2021
2004 establishments in Ireland
2021 disestablishments in Ireland
Television stations in Ireland
Association football on Irish television